Marco's Pizza, operated by Marco's Franchising, LLC, is an American restaurant chain and interstate franchise based in Toledo, Ohio, that specializes in Italian-American cuisine. The first store was opened in Oregon, Ohio on Starr Avenue. It was founded by Italian immigrant Pasquale "Pat" Giammarco in February 18, 1978.

As of mid-2017, there were more than 800 franchised Marco's Pizza locations in 34 states and Puerto Rico, as well as the Bahamas and India. Most recently, it was announced that Marco's Pizza had doubled its size and expected to open its 1000th store by the end of 2018. Marco's Pizza credits its franchisees as well as its dough, three-cheese blend, and pizza sauce for its strong growth. Unlike most major pizza chains, Marco's dough is made from scratch everyday, and their cheese is never frozen.

In 2016, Marco's Pizza was ranked at #10 on the Pizza Today list of the Top 100 Pizza Companies in the United States. The company was also named one of Marketing Quarterlys Top 25 Pizza Chains and named by Franchising World as number eight on the magazine's list of "Fast and Serious Growth Franchises". Store locations offer online ordering and payment.

History

Founding
Born in Sulmona, Italy, Pasquale "Pat" Giammarco is the founder of Marco's Pizza. Giammarco moved to the United States from the Abruzzo region of Italy when he was nine years old and grew up in Dearborn, Michigan, where he worked in his family's pizzeria. He and his father made the sauce recipe that is used in Marco's Pizza locations.

Modern history
In 2002, restaurant industry expert Jack Butorac was asked to analyze three restaurant concepts as potential growth opportunities, including Marco's Pizza. He traveled through Ohio and stopped at five Marco's Pizza stores in different cities along his route. He found different exteriors and inconsistent branding, but pizza that was the same at each location. "It was delicious," he told the New York Times in a 2014 interview. A veteran of large franchise operations, he saw the possibilities in this regional brand. "What [Giammarco] didn't have was how to brand it and differentiate it from other brands out there," Butorac told Pizza Marketplace in an interview.

Butorac began working as a consultant with Giammarco and soon began negotiations to purchase the franchising rights to Marco's Pizza. He assumed leadership of the company in January 2004 with a vision to take Marco's Pizza national.

In 2005, nationwide expansion began. Marco's experienced rapid expansion under Butorac's leadership. Since he has owned the company, it has more than doubled in size and expanded to over 35 states, Puerto Rico, the Bahamas, and India. Butorac was presented with the prestigious Golden Chain award, a lifetime-achievement award in the restaurant business, by Restaurant News in July 2017.

Marco's Pizza and its president, Bryon Stephens, were featured on the January 29, 2016, episode of the CBS television program Undercover Boss. The episode won its time slot in the TV ratings with 7.3 million viewers.

Menu 
The Marco's Pizza menu is available for delivery or take-out, while some locations offer dine-in and catering options. The menu includes pizza, subs, wings, salads, CheezyBread, CinnaSquares, pizza bowls, and co-branded Ghirardelli brownies.

Some of Marco's specialty pizzas include White Cheezy, for which the pizza company won a gourmet competition in California.

Among the unusual and specialty pizzas found at various times on the Marco's Pizza menu are Chicken Florentine, Pepperoni Magnifico, Chicken Fresco, Spicy Fresco, and Double Pepperoni Spicy Fresco pizzas. The signature ingredient of the Fresco pizzas is Marco's special giardiniera, an authentic Italian pepper relish.

2017 accolades and ratings 
Marco's Pizza is currently listed at #8 in Pizza Todays Top 100 Pizza Chains for 2017 and was named by Franchise Times as number eight on the magazine's list of Fast and Serious growth franchises. In 2012, Marco's Pizza partnered with privately held movie rental chain Family Video to open Marco's locations in as many as 350 Family Video stores.

In 2014, Marco's Pizza was named the #3 best pizza chain by Consumer Reports magazine on its list of Best and Worst Fast Food Restaurants in America based on survey results. It was the first time Marco's Pizza had ever appeared on this list.
 #1 America's Favorite Pizza Company (2017 Market Force study)
 #2 Pizza company on Business Insiders List of 25 Best Fast Food Chains in America
 #2 on the Restaurant Business Magazine Top Chains by Menu Pizza Category
 #3 Ranking on the Franchise Gator Top 100 Franchises
 #4 on the Franchise Times "Fast and Serious" Smartest Growing Brands
 One of the "Five Chains Taking Over America" from NRN's Top 10 Fastest Growing Chains
 #38 (Top ranked pizza company, up from #81 in 2016) on the Entrepreneur List of Top 500 Franchises
 #46 on the Franchise Direct Top 100 Global Franchises
 Top 200 Franchises Business Review
 #251 (Only pizza company listed) on Forbes Americas Best Employers 2017
 Technomic Top 500 Chains

See also

 List of pizza chains of the United States

References

External links
 

Italian-American cuisine
Italian-American culture in Ohio
Pizza chains of the United States
Pizza franchises
Restaurants established in 1978
Restaurants in Ohio
Companies based in Toledo, Ohio
1978 establishments in Ohio
Regional restaurant chains in the United States
American companies established in 1978